Andrey Keranov (born 20 September 1955) is a Bulgarian gymnast. He competed in eight events at the 1976 Summer Olympics.

References

External links
 

1955 births
Living people
Bulgarian male artistic gymnasts
Olympic gymnasts of Bulgaria
Gymnasts at the 1976 Summer Olympics
Place of birth missing (living people)